Artem Loginov (born 23 June 1991) is a visually impaired Russian sprinter. Competing in the T12 classification, Loginov competed at the 2012 Summer Paralympics in London, winning a gold and bronze medal. He is also a multiple World and European Championships winner, taking twelve medals over five tournaments.

References 

1991 births
Living people
Sportspeople from Barnaul
Russian male sprinters
Paralympic athletes of Russia
Athletes (track and field) at the 2012 Summer Paralympics
Paralympic gold medalists for Russia
Paralympic bronze medalists for Russia
Medalists at the 2012 Summer Paralympics
Paralympic medalists in athletics (track and field)
21st-century Russian people